Jorge da Silva (born 4 January 1966) is a Brazilian athlete. He competed in the men's triple jump at the 1988 Summer Olympics and the 1992 Summer Olympics.

References

1966 births
Living people
Athletes (track and field) at the 1988 Summer Olympics
Athletes (track and field) at the 1992 Summer Olympics
Brazilian male triple jumpers
Olympic athletes of Brazil
Place of birth missing (living people)